Azul 29 (Portuguese for Blue 29) was a short-lived Brazilian new wave band, founded in 1982 by two former members of synthpop band Agentss. They are famous for their 1984 hit "Videogame".

History
Azul 29 was founded in the city of São Paulo in April 1982, by Agentss guitarist Eduardo Amarante and Thomas Bielefeld. Their first recording was the song "Ciências Sensuais". After Agentss disbanded in 1983, Amarante and Bielefeld were joined by Malcolm Oakley and Thomas "Miko" Susemihl (who also played for Agentss). In the same year, they would release a self-titled EP via WEA (present-day Warner Music Group), containing the tracks "Metrópole" and "Olhar".

In 1984 they released a second self-titled EP, also via WEA, containing the songs "Videogame" and "O Teu Nome em Neon"; in this EP, the electronic elements in their music are noticeably more prominent than in their previous release. "Videogame" would become Azul 29's greatest hit after being used in the soundtrack of the popular 1984 film Bete Balanço, directed by Lael Rodrigues.

Despite their success, the band came to an end in 1985. Futurely, both Oakley and Amarante would join New Romantic post-punk band Zero.

On August 18, 2016, it was announced that Thomas Bielefeld had died at his hometown of Pindamonhangaba, after suffering from heart and respiratory failure.

Line-up
 Thomas Bielefeld – vocals, keyboards (1982–1985; died 2016)
 Eduardo Amarante – guitar, keyboards (1982–1985)
 Thomas "Miko" Susemihl – bass (1983–1985)
 Malcolm Oakley – drums (1983–1985)

Discography

Singles
 1982: "Ciências Sensuais"

Extended plays
 1983: Azul 29
 1984: Azul 29

Compilations
 2005: Não Wave
Featured the song "Ciências Sensuais".

References

External links
 Azul 29 on YouTube

Musical groups established in 1982
1982 establishments in Brazil
Musical groups disestablished in 1985
1985 disestablishments in Brazil
Synth-pop new wave musical groups
Brazilian new wave musical groups
Brazilian electronic music groups
Musical groups from São Paulo
Musical quartets